Michael of Klopsk ( - Mikhail Klopsky), died ca. 1458, was a 15th-century Russian Orthodox fool-for-Christ's-sake associated with the Klopsky Monastery of the Holy Trinity near Novgorod on the river Veryazha.

According to Valentin Yanin, Michael was the son or grandson of Dmitry Mikhailovich Volyn-Bobrok ("Little Beaver"), the hero of the Battle of Kulikovo, and Anna Ivanovna, daughter of Grand Prince Ivan II Ivanovich the Fair, sister of Dmitry Donskoy. A hagiography of the saint, was written in 1478-9, redacted in the 90's, and again in 1537. Although folklorish, it provides the earliest literary evidence for Michael's activities in the monastery.

During the period of the Muscovite-Lithuanian Wars, a mysterious fool-for-Christ's-sake appeared in the Monastery of the Holy Trinity. Sometime after being accepted by the monastery, but still nameless to his fellow monks, he was recognized by prince Konstantin Dmitrievich (1389-1433), who visited the monastery with his wife in 1413, as "our Mikhail."

Among the miracles attributed to the saint by the hagiography are the conversion of robbers, one of whom became the monk Dorofey, the discovery of an inexhaustible fountain, the prediction of weather, and various other acts of clairvoyance and prophecy.

Michael died prior to 1458 and was canonized by the Russian Orthodox Church a century later, in 1547.  His memory is commemorated by the Eastern Orthodox Church on January 11. His relics are venerated at the Klopsky Monastery.

References

Russian saints
15th-century Christian saints
15th-century Russian people
Yurodivy
1450s deaths
15th-century Eastern Orthodox Christians
Year of birth unknown